This is a list of airlines currently operating in Saint Vincent and the Grenadines.

See also
 List of airlines
 List of airports in Saint Vincent and the Grenadines
 Eastern Caribbean Civil Aviation Authority (ECCAA)

Saint Vincent and the Grenadines
Airlines
Saint Vincent and the Grenadines
Airlines